is a linguist, Old Testament scholar, Dean of Faculty and professor of Old Testament professor of Japan Bible Seminary. His degrees are M.Div., M.A., Ph.D. He is a chairman of the Tokyo Museum of Biblical Archaeology, and editor of Exegetica: Studies in Biblical Exegesis and chairman of New Japanese Bible（新改訳）Publishing Association. Most notably responsible for the commentary on the First Book of Samuel in the New International Commentary on the Old Testament series.

He is well known as an Ugarit scholar.

History 
He was born in Kobe in 1944. He graduated from Hitotsubashi University in 1966, where he had majored in Commerce. He went to America to study non theological subject. While studying ethics, he became interested in Old Testament study. He applied to Asbury Theological Seminary to study for an M.Div., graduating in 1969. He then applied to Brandeis University for a research master's degree in Mediterranean Studies, which he completed in 1971. Tsumura's doctorate, also in Mediterranean Studies, was also awarded by the same university in 1973, for his work on Ugarit.

After he graduated from Brandeis University  in 1974, he came back to Japan. Then he became a professor of Japan Bible Seminary as a lecturer in Old Testament.

He became an Associate Professor of Semitic Linguistics of University of Tsukuba from 1975 to 1990. He taught Literature and Linguistics. He came back to Japan Bible Seminary in 1990.

He is known as a world-wide scholar. He served at Harvard University, Divinity School as a visiting scholar from 1973 to 1974. He also worked at University of Michigan as a visiting scholar in 1979.

He stayed at Tyndale House, Cambridge as a research fellow from 1986 to 1988 and at Harvard University, Department of Near Eastern Studies as a visiting scholar in 1994.

He has visited Hong Kong several times to teach Old Testament at the China Graduate School of Theology.

Works

Thesis

Books

References

External links 
Personal website
Who Did the Notes for the Upcoming ESV Study Bible?
15th World Congress of Jewish Studies
Polysemy and Parallelism in Hab 1,8–9
UGARITIC POETRY AND HABAKKUK 3
OLAC Record
Meetings abstract
JSTOR - or Journal Storage

1944 births
People from Kobe
Japanese non-fiction writers
Living people
Old Testament scholars
Hitotsubashi University alumni
Asbury Theological Seminary alumni
Brandeis University alumni
Academic staff of the University of Tsukuba